Barnet Horse Fair is an 1896 British short black-and-white silent documentary film produced by Robert W. Paul. Given the age of this film the copyright has now expired.

The Barnet Horse Fair had begun in the 16th century and was originally held twice a year before becoming an annual event. Up until the 20th Century it mainly involved the sale of horses and other livestock.

References

External links 
 

1896 films
1890s British films
British short documentary films
British silent short films
1890s short documentary films
Black-and-white documentary films
Films about horses
British black-and-white films